Black Cat is the seventh studio album by American rock band Never Shout Never, featuring 10 tracks. It was released on August 7, 2015 through Warner Bros. Records

Singles
"Hey! We Ok" is the first single from the album being released on June 9, 2015. It was nominated at the 2016 Alternative Press Music Awards for "Song of the Year". On February 5, 2016, "Red Balloon" was released as the second single.

Track listing
Track listing according to iTunes.

Charts

Release history

References

2015 albums
Never Shout Never albums
Albums produced by Dennis Herring
Warner Records albums